Pinishook Creek is a stream in Neshoba and 
Winston counties in the U.S. state of Mississippi. It is a tributary to the Pearl River.

Pinishook is a name derived from the Choctaw language meaning "linden or basswood tree".

References

Rivers of Mississippi
Rivers of Neshoba County, Mississippi
Rivers of Winston County, Mississippi
Mississippi placenames of Native American origin